In India, the Head of Forest Forces (HoFF) is the highest ranking officer of the elite Indian Forest Service (IFS) in Indian States and Union Territories. All Head of Forest Forces are IFS officers. The HoFF is usually the head of the forest department in every Indian state and is selected by the Governor, based on the recommendation of the council of ministers led by the Chief Minister, from among the senior most Principal Chief Conservators of Forests in the state. The post of HoFF is equivalent in rank, in states, to that of the State Police Chief Indian Police Service, chief secretary and  lieutenant general of army.

List of current Heads of Forest Forces in the States and Union territories of India

See also 
 Indian Forest Service
 Indian Council of Forestry Research and Education
 Ministry of Environment and Forests
 Indian Administrative Service (IAS)
 All India Services
 Van Vigyan Kendra (Forest Science Centres)
 Indira Gandhi National Forest Academy
 Chief Secretary
 Director General of Police
 Advocate General

References

All India Services
Forest administration in India
Ministry of Environment, Forest and Climate Change

fr:Fonction publique en Inde#Fonction publique forestière indienne